In chemistry, π-effects or π-interactions are a type of non-covalent interaction that involves π systems. Just like in an electrostatic interaction where a region of negative charge interacts with a positive charge, the electron-rich π system can interact with a metal (cationic or neutral), an anion, another molecule and even another π system. Non-covalent interactions involving π systems are pivotal to biological events such as protein-ligand recognition.

Types
The most common types of π-interactions involve: 
Metal–π interactions: involves interaction of a metal and the face of a π system, the metal can be a cation (known as cation–π interactions) or neutral
Polar–π interactions: involves interaction of a polar molecule and quadrupole moment a π system.

Aromatic–aromatic interactions (π stacking): involves interactions of aromatic molecules with each other.
Arene–perfluoroarene interaction: electron-rich benzene ring interacts with electron-poor hexafluorobenzene.

π donor–acceptor interactions: interaction between low energy empty orbital (acceptor) and a high-energy filled orbital (donor).

Anion–π interactions: interaction of anion with π system
Cation–π interactions: interaction of a cation with a π system
C–H–π interactions: interaction of C-H with π system: These interactions are well studied using experimental as well as computational techniques.

Metal–π interactions

Metal–π interactions play a major role in organometallics. Linear and cyclic π systems bond to metals allowing organic complexes to bond to metals.

Linear systems
Ethylene – π
In the most simple linear π systems, bonding to metals takes place by two interactions. Electron density is donated directly to the metal like a sigma bond would be formed. Also, the metal can donate electron density back to the linear π system (ethylene) from the metal’s d orbital to the empty π* orbital of ethylene.

Allyl–π
Allyl groups can bond to metals as trihapto or monohapto ligands. Monohapto ligands bind mostly sigma orbitals and trihapto ligands bind using delocalized π orbitals. In essence the monohapto ligand binds the metal as an allyl group and the trihapto ligand binds over all three carbons, where the lowest energy π orbital donates electron density and the highest energy π orbital accepts electron density. 
The allyl complex is diverse because it can alter the metal's electron count by transferring between a monohapto (1 electron, η1) and trihapto ligand (3 electrons, η3). This fluctuation allows stability when a two-electron-donating group bonds or breaks from the metal.

Cyclic systems

The specifics for binding of π cyclic systems are much more complex and depend on the electrons, the HOMO, and the LUMO in each individual case of molecules. Cyclic π systems can bind monohapto or polyhapto depending on the individual situation. This means that π bonds can bind individually to the metal or there can be a single bond from the center of a benzene or cyclopentadienyl complex. Of course the bonding modes (η1, η3, η5, etc.) determine the number of donated electrons (1, 3, 5, etc.). The diversity of these cyclic complexes allows for a seemingly endless number of metallic structures.

Catalysis
The use of organometallic structures led by π–metal bonding plays an enormous role in the catalysis of organic reactions. The Stille reaction is a widely known and important reaction in organic synthesis. π interactions with the Pd catalyst in this reaction are almost necessary in pushing this reaction to completion (alkyl groups transfer is rather slow).
Other widely known reactions based on π–metal catalysis interactions are:
Heck reaction 
Hiyama coupling 
Kumada coupling
Negishi coupling 
Petasis reaction 
Sonogashira coupling
Suzuki reaction.

π–metal interactions can also be involved directly with the function of ligands on the catalyst. Chemistry involving nickel catalysis of Suzuki reactions was greatly affected by pyrazoles and pyrazolates acting as coplanar ligand. The π interactions tied multiple pyrazoles and pyrazolates together around the nickel metal to cause reaction results.

Another π metal interaction directly involved with catalysis involves π stacking. Ferrocene is the standard example where the metal (iron) is trapped in between two cyclopentadienyl ligands. These interactions are commonly referred to as sandwich compounds.

Specific research
 
Due to reasons explained earlier in the article, the bonding between a nucleophilic olefin and an electrophilic palladium(II) leaves olefin susceptible to nucleophilic attack. This is true if the olefin is coordinated around Pd as the corner of a square planar complex or as the side of a cationic 18-electron Pd complex. In both cases electron donating groups on the olefin stabilize the complex, but anionic electron donors actually destabilized the complex in the case of the 18-electron Pd complex. The authors of this research proposed that when the olefin π bond is aligned on the side of the square planar Pd complex, the π* backfilling of electron density from Pd to olefin is enhanced because the more electron withdrawing orbital of the π complex can overlap better with the electron donating orbital of Pd.

Anion–π interactions
Anion and π–aromatic systems (typically electron-deficient) create an interaction that is associated with the repulsive forces of the structures. These repulsive forces involve electrostatic and anion-induced polarized interactions. This force allows for the systems to be used as receptors and channels in supramolecular chemistry for applications in the medical (synthetic membranes, ion channels) and environmental fields (e.g. sensing, removal of ions from water).

The first X-ray crystal structure that depicted anion–π interactions was reported in 2004. In addition to this being depicted in the solid state, there is also evidence that the interaction is present in solution.

π-effects in biological systems

π-effects have an important contribution to biological systems since they provide a significant amount of binding enthalpy. Neurotransmitters produce most of their biological effect by binding to the active site of a protein receptor. Pioneering work of Dennis A. Dougherty is a proof that such kind of binding stabilization is the effect of cation-π interactions of the acetylcholine  (Ach) neurotransmitter. The structure of acetylcholine esterase includes 14 highly conserved aromatic residues. The trimethyl ammonium group of Ach binds to the aromatic residue of tryptophan (Trp). The indole site provides a much more intense region of negative electrostatic potential than benzene and phenol residue of Phe and Tyr. S-Adenosyl methionine (SAM) can act as a catalyst for the transfer of methyl group from the sulfonium compound to nucleophile. The nucleophile can be any of a broad range structures including nucleic acids, proteins, sugars or C=C bond of lipids or steroids. The van der Waals contact between S-CH3 unit of SAM and the aromatic face of a Trp residue, in favorable alignment for catalysis assisted by cation-π interaction.

A great deal of circumstantial evidence places aromatic residues in the active site of a number of proteins that interact with cations but the presence of cation-π interaction in biological system does not rule out the conventional ion-pair interaction. In fact there is a good evidence for the existence of both type of interaction in model system.

In supramolecular assembly 

 systems are important building blocks in supramolecular assembly because of their versatile noncovalent interactions with various functional groups. Particularly, \pi - \pi  , CH-\pi  and \pi -cation interactions are widely used in supramolecular assembly and recognition.

\pi-\pi concerns the direct interactions between two -systems; and cation-\pi  interaction arises from the electrostatic interaction of a cation with the face of the -system. Unlike these two interactions, the CH-\pi  interaction arises mainly from charge transfer between the C–H orbital and the -system.

References

Intermolecular forces